Republic is a high peak in Gusar District of Azerbaijan. The peak was named Republic and a monument was built on the peak dedicated to 100th anniversary of the Azerbaijan Democratic Republic on 28 May. A road to the mountain peak was opened on 3 May, while the first climb occurred on 28 May, 2018. The project was part of the Azerbaijani President Ilham Aliyev's "Year of the Republic" order.

References

External links 
 

Mountains of Azerbaijan
Mountains of Russia